Elerji (previously Jelarji) is a small settlement in the City Municipality of Koper in the Littoral region of Slovenia on the border with Italy.

Name
The name of the settlement was changed from Jelarji to Elerji in 2017.

References

External links
Elerji (Jelarji) on Geopedia

Populated places in the City Municipality of Koper